The Ambassador was a passenger train that traveled from Boston, Massachusetts and New York City, New York to Montreal, Quebec. The train was jointly operated by the New York, New Haven and Hartford Railroad, Boston and Maine Railroad, the Central Vermont Railroad, and the Canadian National Railway.  Beginning service on April 26, 1926, the Ambassador operated on a daytime schedule between Boston and Montreal, with coach, dining, and parlor cars in the consist. The route going north of White River Junction went northwest, through Montpelier and Essex Junction toward Montreal.  There were also through cars to New York City offered until the mid-1950s, split from the Ambassador's consist in White River Junction, Vermont and added to the Connecticut Yankee train for points south. In its route from Boston's North Station it passed through Manchester (Union Station), Concord and Franklin in New Hampshire. 

In 1956, with traffic declining, through service to Boston from Montreal was terminated, replaced with a transfer to Boston and Maine rail diesel cars at White River Junction, and the Ambassador name was applied to the Montreal—New York City train, which by 1958 lost food service and consisted only of coaches.  On September 3, 1966, the Ambassador was discontinued after its operators sought and received approval from the Interstate Commerce Commission to terminate service.

References

International named passenger trains
Railway services introduced in 1926
Railway services discontinued in 1966
Named passenger trains of the United States
Named passenger trains of Canada
Passenger rail transportation in Vermont
Passenger rail transportation in New Hampshire
Passenger rail transportation in Massachusetts
Passenger rail transportation in Connecticut
Passenger rail transportation in New York (state)